"T-Shirt Weather" is a song by British indie rock band, Circa Waves, from their debut studio album Young Chasers (2015).

The single was released on 6 April 2015. The single is the band's most successful single to date, earning Silver certification by the British Phonographic Industry. The single charted in the UK, Scotland, Belgium and Japan.

Charts

References 

2015 singles
2015 songs
Circa Waves songs
Virgin EMI Records singles